Cythraul is an old Welsh word, still in everyday use, meaning 'devil' or, with a capital letter, the Devil, probably deriving from Latin 'Contrarius', 'the Opposer, Enemy'. Contr- would go to Welsh cythr- straightforwardly according to historical phonology, and the form 'cythraul' not *cythraur is the result of dissimilation. It is likely to be an early Christian borrowing from Ecclesiastical Latin, like numerous other words in the Welsh and Irish languages. Diawl (from Latin diablos) is usually used for the Devil (Satan) today, cythraul usually being used as a pejorative, e.g. "y cythraul bach!" '(you) little devil/rascal!'.

Modern Druidic interpretation
Cythraul has been mislabelled as a 'spirit of Chaos' by some modern Druids, an error which dates back as far as Iolo Morganwg's Barddas. It has found its way into various sourcebooks for neo-Druidry, usually by authors who do not speak Welsh and quite unaware of its history or origin. According to this error, 'Cythraul' is supposed to be a synonym for Chaos, in some way known to the ancient Druids, which is historically impossible and linguistically extremely unlikely.

Further reading 	 
Piggott, Stuart (1975) The Druids. London, Thames and Hudson	 
Aldhouse-Green, Miranda (1997) Exploring the World of the Druids. London, Thames and Hudson
Fitzpatrick, A.P. (1997) Who were the Druids? London, Weidenfeld & Nicolson

Christianity in Wales
Druidry
Welsh folklore
Welsh words and phrases